Mašinska industrija Niš (abbr. MIN) or Mechanical Industry Niš, is a Serbian holding corporation headquartered in Niš, Serbia. It is engaged in the energy, mining, process engineering, equipment for agriculture and a railways program. It declared bankruptcy in April 2015.

History
MIN was founded in 1884 as Railways workshop for the maintenance and repair of rolling stock. It was founded after construction of Belgrade-Niš railway. By the year 1890 the assembly, sawmills, steel foundry, forge, pattern shop and tool room were established. With their integration and the integration of other sectors that have emerged later, the Mechanical Industry Niš (MIN) was founded.

MIN was one of the main companies who maintained Yugoslav Railways diesel locomotives. It has also produced several diesel locomotives series for both railways and industry. At peak MIN employed 17.000 workers.

In April 2015, around 500 employees took severance payments and the company went into bankruptcy procedure.

Products

Locomotives

Diesel-hydraulic locomotive DHL-600 class 734
Diesel-hydraulic locomotive DHL-650 class 735
Diesel-hydraulic locomotive DHL-200
Diesel-hydraulic locomotive DHL-450 U
Diesel-hydraulic locomotive DHSL-3,0 
Diesel-hydraulic draisine DHD-200 class 915
Heavy motor draisine TMD-25
Heavy motor draisine TMD-22
Light motor draisine LMD-9
Motor draisine for maintenance of catenary TMD-22 km
Heavy motor draisine for building and maintenance of catenary TMD-42 km

Holding members before process of privatization

LIV MIN
MIN Sivi liv
MIN Obojeni metali
MIN Modelara
MIN Kovačnica
MIN Presa
MIN Svrljig
MIN Izgradnja
MIN Lokomotiva
MIN Vagonka
MIN Čelik
MIN AGH
MIN FAM
MIN Projekat
MIN Specijalna vozila
MIN Metal Merošina
MIN Balkan
MIN Mont
MIN Oprema
MIN Fitip
MIN Inženjering
MIN Tehnoproces
MIN Niš Mont
MIN OMIN
MIN Jedinstvo
MIN Komerc
MIN Institut
MIN Inspekt
MIN Skretnice
MIN ERC
MIN Zaštita
MIN Gas

References

External links
 Vossloh MIN Skretnice d.o.o
 Blok Signal d.o.o. Niš

1884 establishments in Serbia
Companies based in Niš
D.o.o. companies in Serbia
Locomotive manufacturers of Serbia
Manufacturing companies established in 1884
Rail transport in Serbia
Rolling stock manufacturers of Serbia
Serbian brands